Fabio Scarsella (born 19 July 1989) is an Italian footballer who plays as a midfielder for  club Vicenza.

Club career
He made his Serie B debut for Frosinone on 30 May 2009 in a game against Grosseto.

On 3 July 2021, he signed a two-year contract with Modena.

On 28 July 2022, Scarsella moved to Vicenza on a two-year deal.

Honours

Club 
Cremonese
 Lega Pro: 2016–17

References

External links
 

1989 births
Living people
People from Alatri
Footballers from Lazio
Italian footballers
Association football midfielders
Serie B players
Serie C players
Frosinone Calcio players
A.S. Melfi players
A.S. Martina Franca 1947 players
Vigor Lamezia players
Catania S.S.D. players
U.S. Cremonese players
Trapani Calcio players
FeralpiSalò players
Modena F.C. players
L.R. Vicenza players
Sportspeople from the Province of Frosinone
A.C. Sangiustese players